The 1989–90 La Liga season, the 59th since its establishment, started on September 2, 1989, and finished on May 6, 1990. Real Madrid finished the season as champions for the fifth season running.

Team information

Clubs and locations

League table

Relegation playoff

First Leg

Second Leg

Results

Pichichi 

La Liga seasons
1989–90 in Spanish football leagues
Spain